Anastasio Alfaro (February 16, 1865 – January 20, 1951) was a Costa Rican zoologist, geologist and explorer.

Alfaro was director of the National Museum of Costa Rica, and whilst holding this position arranged the Costa Rican display at the Historical American Exposition in Madrid. Limon worm salamander Oedipina alfaroi is named after him.

References

External links
 Biography (in Spanish)

1865 births
1951 deaths
19th-century zoologists
Costa Rican biologists
Costa Rican geologists
Costa Rican explorers
20th-century zoologists